Valerie Sanderson (born 1960 in Nottingham) is one of the main presenters of The Newsroom (and previously World Briefing) on the BBC World Service. Sanderson was one of the original presenters on BBC News 24 when it launched in 1997.

Early life
She studied at St Andrews University, then did a postgraduate degree at Emory University in Atlanta, Georgia.

BBC
She joined the BBC in 1985 as a producer on Radio 4's Today programme. She has been a reporter on the Today programme and BBC's Breakfast News.  She was also on the Spotlight programme based in Plymouth from 1989. She helped to launch Radio Five Live in 1994. Sanderson was one of the launch presenters for BBC News 24 in 1997 and could often be seen presenting the 1-4pm slot on News 24 alongside Bill Turnbull or Chris Eakin.

Sanderson was one of the main presenters of World Briefing on the BBC World Service. She occasionally presents the BBC's daily audio news podcast Newspod.  In April 2013 World Briefing was replaced by The Newsroom which Sanderson continues to present.

Personal life
She was the partner of Radio Four's Today programme presenter John Humphrys, but they have since separated. They have one child.

References

External links
 News 24 profile 
   Valerie Sanderson Profile TV Newsroom
  Valerie and John Humphrys Telegraph Online

1960 births
Living people
BBC newsreaders and journalists
BBC World Service people
Alumni of the University of St Andrews
People from Nottingham